The Hymn of the Bolshevik Party is a song composed by Alexander Alexandrov. Its lyrics are written by Vasily Lebedev-Kumach. The opening bars of the song is sampled from Life has Become Better, one of Alexandrov's previous pieces. From the 1930s to the 1950s, this served as the unofficial anthem of the Bolshevik Party. In 2016, Communists of Russia, a Russian communist party, declared that this piece is their party anthem.

The same melody for the hymn is used for the State Anthem of the Soviet Union and the Russian National Anthem.

Lyrics

See also
 Anthem of the Soviet Union
 Life has become better
 National anthem of Russia

References

Russian patriotic songs
Soviet songs